Romagnat (Auvergnat: Romanhat) is a commune in the Puy-de-Dôme department in Auvergne in central France.

Population

Twin towns
  Licciana Nardi, Italy

See also
 Communes of the Puy-de-Dôme department

References

Communes of Puy-de-Dôme